A by-election was held in the Dáil Éireann Donegal North-East constituency in Ireland on 2 April 1996. It followed the death of Independent Fianna Fáil Teachta Dála (TD) and former Minister Neil Blaney on 8 November 1995.

The election was won by Donegal County Councillor Cecilia Keaveney of Fianna Fáil.

Among the candidates were Donegal County Councillor, brother of Neil Blaney, and future TD Harry Blaney, Senator and Donegal County Councillor Seán Maloney and Vice President of Sinn Féin and future Member of Parliament for West Tyrone Pat Doherty

On the same day, a by-election took place in Dublin West.

Result

See also
List of Dáil by-elections
Dáil constituencies

References

External links
Donegal North–East: 1996 by-election Results, Counts, Stats and Analysis
ElectionsIreland.org: 27th Dail By Elections - Donegal North East First Preference Votes

1996 in Irish politics
1996 elections in the Republic of Ireland
27th Dáil
By-elections in the Republic of Ireland
Elections in County Donegal
April 1996 events in Europe